Screaming Down the Gravity Well is the second studio album by Death Ride 69, released in 1996 by Fifth Colvmn Records. Marco Gariboldi of Fabryka called the album "a crescendo of harsh guitars, distortions and hammering drums directed by the high and charismatic voice of Linda" and "a very good album by an underrated and forgotten band." Aiding & Abetting was more critical, saying "the general lack of creative thought in the songwriting is pretty distressing" and claiming the band was "scraping the bottom of the barrel."

Track listing

Personnel 
Adapted from the Screaming Down the Gravity Well liner notes.

Death Ride 69
 Mark Blasquez – electric guitar, bass guitar, programming, production
 Linda LeSabre – lead vocals, drums, sampler, drum programming

Additional musicians
 DJ Hothead – vocals (2)
 Groovie Mann – vocals (2, 10)

Production and design
 D. Dawson – photography
 Rob Gibson – cover art
 Doug Green – recording, mixing
 Buzz McCoy – production

Release history

References

External links 
 

1996 albums
Death Ride 69 albums
Fifth Colvmn Records albums